16th SFFCC Awards
December 10, 2017

Picture: 
The Florida Project

Animated Feature: 
Coco

Documentary: 
Faces Places

Foreign Language Picture: 
BPM (Beats per Minute)

The 16th San Francisco Film Critics Circle Awards, honoring the best in film for 2017, were given on December 10, 2017.

Winners

These are the nominees for the 16th SFFCC Awards. Winners are listed at the top of each list:

Special awards

Special Citation Award for under-appreciated independent cinema
 Brimstone & Glory
 Columbus
 The Other Kids

Marlon Riggs Award for courage & vision in the Bay Area film community
 Peter Bratt

References

External links
 The San Francisco Film Critics Circle

San Francisco Film Critics Circle Awards
2017 film awards
2017 in San Francisco